$10,001 primarily refers banknotes, bills or coins, including:

Currency 

Australian one dollar coin, which replaced the one dollar note
Loonie, which replaced the one dollar bill in Canada
United States one-dollar bill, a denomination of United States currency
Dollar coin (United States), a metal coin
New Zealand one-dollar coin, which replaced the one dollar note
Dollar (Hong Kong coin), coin of the Hong Kong dollar
The one-dollar banknotes of Zimbabwe

Other currencies with $1 banknotes, bills or coins are:

 Dollars

Bahamian dollar
Barbadian dollar
Belize dollar
Bermudian dollar
Brunei dollar

Cayman Islands dollar
Cook Islands dollar
East Caribbean dollar
Fijian dollar
Guyanese dollar

Jamaican dollar
Liberian dollar
Namibian dollar

Samoan tālā
Singapore dollar
Solomon Islands dollar
Surinamese dollar
New Taiwan dollar
Trinidad and Tobago dollar
Tuvaluan dollar

Pesos

Argentine peso
Chilean peso

Cuban peso
Dominican peso
Mexican peso
Uruguayan peso

Other currencies

Brazilian real
Cape Verdean escudo
Nicaraguan córdoba
Tongan paanga

Other uses 
 $1, a formal parameter in some programming languages
 One Dollar (TV series), American mystery thriller drama series that premiered in 2018

See also
Dollar sign $, a symbol primarily used to indicate the various peso and dollar units of currency around the world
Dollar, the name of several currencies
Peso, the name of the monetary unit of Spain and several former Spanish colonies